Lycium intricatum, the southern boxthorn, is a species of plants in the family Solanaceae (nightshades).

Sources

References 

intricatum
Flora of Malta